Milton is a town in Sussex County, Delaware, United States, on the Delmarva Peninsula. It is located on the Broadkill River, which empties into Delaware Bay. The population was 2,576 at the 2010 census, an increase of 55.5% over the previous decade.

It is part of the rapidly growing Cape Region and lies within the Salisbury, Maryland-Delaware Metropolitan Statistical Area. Delaware Route 5 passes through Milton.

History 

Located at the head of the Broadkill River, which enters Delaware Bay, the Milton area was first settled in 1675 by English colonists and founded as "Head of Broadkiln" in 1763. It became important for shipbuilding. The town was known by renamed by the Delaware Legislature in 1807, in honor of the English poet John Milton.  The Delaware General Assembly passed a charter on March 17, 1865, that recognized the Town of Milton as a municipality.

History and Milton's shipbuilding heritage remain very important to the town, which is home to some of the finest Victorian and Colonial architecture in Delaware. Many of the homes have been restored to their original form, particularly those on Union and Federal streets.

Milton has 198 contributing structures listed within its Federal Register Historic District. Significant buildings and sites are the Lydia Black Cannon Museum, the Governor James Carey home, the Chestnut Street Cemetery, and the Governor David Hazzard Mansion. The Hazzard House and Gov. James Ponder House were listed on the National Register of Historic Places in 1973. The Milton Historic District was added in 1982.

Milton serves local residents and summer tourists in the Milton, Broadkill Beach and Primehook Beach areas with family-operated businesses and new office and shopping complexes. Several local businesses in the area are served by the Delmarva Central Railroad, which operates a branch that extends to Milton from Ellendale. Recreational opportunities abound with the Broadkill River, Wagamon's Pond, Diamond Pond and Lavinia Pond. Public boat docks and fishing piers are also available. It is within an easy drive to the coastal resorts of Lewes and Rehoboth Beach, Delaware.

A footpath known as the Governors Walk follows the Broadkill River in central Milton.  The Nature Conservancy established a preserve along the river downstream of Milton in 1998.  , an annual canoe and kayak race was being held on the river in Milton. The river passes through and feeds Prime Hook National Wildlife Refuge to the east before entering Delaware Bay.

Milton is the home of the Dogfish Head Brewery, a well-known East Coast beer-maker.

Transportation

Roads are the main means of transport to and from Milton. Delaware Route 5 is the main highway serving Milton, running on a north-south alignment through the center of town. Trucks are served by a bypass route, Delaware Route 5 Alternate, which bypasses downtown to the west. Delaware Route 16 also passes through Milton, skimming the north side of town on an east-west alignment. Delaware Route 30 passes just outside the town to the west, following a similar north-south alignment to parallel DE 5. DART First State provides bus service to Milton along Route 303, which runs north to Dover and south to Georgetown. The Delmarva Central Railroad's Milton Industrial Track line runs from Milton west to a junction with the Indian River Subdivision in Ellendale.

Geography
Milton is located along the Broadkill River.

Demographics

As of the census of 2000, there were 1,657 people, 700 households, and 438 families residing in the town. The racial makeup of the town was 67.11% White, 24.32% Black, 0.24% Native American, 0.48% Asian, 0.12% Pacific Islander, 6.04% from other races, and 1.69% from two or more races. Hispanic or Latino of any race were 8.93% of the population.

There were 700 households, out of which 31.4% had children under the age of 18 living with them, 37.3% were married couples living together, 20.1% had a female householder with no husband present, and 37.4% were non-families. 31.3% of all households were made up of individuals, and 17.4% had someone living alone who was 65 years of age or older.  The average household size was 2.33 and the average family size was 2.90.

In the town, the population was spread out, with 24.6% under the age of 18, 10.2% from 18 to 24, 26.4% from 25 to 44, 22.0% from 45 to 64, and 16.8% who were 65 years of age or older.  The median age was 37 years. For every 100 females, there were 78.7 males.  For every 100 females age 18 and over, there were 71.8 males.

The median income for a household in the town was $32,368, and the median income for a family was $40,313. Males had a median income of $26,065 versus $23,269 for females. The per capita income for the town was $17,016.  About 12.8% of families and 18.0% of the population were below the poverty line, including 28.6% of those under age 18 and 14.0% of those age 65 or over.

Notable people
 Jimmie Allen, country singer
 Joseph M. Carey, Governor of Wyoming from 1911 to 1915
 David Hazzard (1781–1864), politician, Delaware Governor
 Robert G. Houston, publisher, lawyer, politician
 James Ponder (1819–1897), politician, Delaware Governor
 Bryan Stevenson, lawyer, activist, author, law professor; founder and executive director of Equal Justice Initiative based in Montgomery, Alabama

Education
It is in the Cape Henlopen School District. The Milton School District was consolidated into the Cape Henlopen district in 1969.

Two elementary schools, Milton Elementary School and H. O. Brittingham Elementary School, serve sections of Milton.

Cape Henlopen High School is the sole comprehensive high school of the district.

Gallery

Climate

References

External links

Historic Milton Delaware
Town of Milton Delaware

Towns in Sussex County, Delaware
Towns in Delaware
Salisbury metropolitan area